The 2007 Stroud Council election took place on 3 May 2007 to elect members of Stroud District Council in Gloucestershire, England. One third of the council was up for election and the Conservative Party stayed in overall control of the council.

After the election, the composition of the council was
Conservative 31
Labour 9
Green 5
Liberal Democrat 4
Independent 2

Election result
The results saw the Conservatives stay in control of the council after making a net gain of 2 seats to hold 31 of the 51 seats. The Conservatives gained Farmhill and Paganhill from an independent, Dursley and Upton St Leonards from the Liberal Democrats and Cam East from the Labour Party. However Labour gained Cainscross back from the Conservatives, while the Liberal Democrats defeated the Conservative cabinet member Nigel Cooper in Rodborough by 5 votes. Meanwhile, the Greens held all 4 seats they had been defending and came within 12 votes of taking Nailsworth from the Conservatives. Overall turnout in the election was 41.17%.

Ward results

References

2007 English local elections
2007
2000s in Gloucestershire